Energy policy is the manner in which a given entity (often governmental) has decided to address issues of energy development including energy conversion, distribution and use as well as reduction of greenhouse gas emissions in order to contribute to climate change mitigation. The attributes of energy policy may include legislation, international treaties, incentives to investment, guidelines for energy conservation, taxation and other public policy techniques. Energy is a core component of modern economies. A functioning economy requires not only labor and capital but also energy, for manufacturing processes, transportation, communication, agriculture, and more. Energy planning is more detailed than energy policy. 

Energy policy is closely related to climate change policy because totalled worldwide the energy sector emits more greenhouse gas than other sectors.

Purposes
Access to energy is critical for basic social needs, such as lighting, heating, cooking, and healthcare. Given the importance of energy, the price of energy has a direct effect on jobs, economic productivity, business competitiveness, and the cost of goods and services.

Frequently the dominant issue of energy policy is the risk of supply-demand mismatch (see: energy crisis). Current energy policies also address environmental issues (see: climate change), particularly challenging because of the need to reconcile global objectives and international rules with domestic needs and laws.

The "human dimensions" of energy use are of increasing interest to  business, utilities, and policymakers. Using the social sciences to gain insights into energy consumer behavior can help policymakers to make better decisions about broad-based climate and energy options. This could facilitate more efficient energy use,  renewable-energy commercialization, and  carbon-emission reductions.

Methods 
The attributes of energy policy may include legislation, international treaties, incentives to investment, guidelines for energy conservation, taxation and other public policy techniques. 

Economic and energy modelling can be used by governmental or inter-governmental bodies as an advisory and analysis tool (see: economic model, POLES).

Policy contexts

National energy policy 
Some governments state an explicit energy policy. Others do not but in any case, each government practices some type of energy policy.

Measures used to produce an energy policy 

A national energy policy comprises a set of measures involving that country's laws, treaties and agency directives. The energy policy of a sovereign nation may include one or more of the following measures:

 statement of national policy regarding energy planning, energy generation, transmission and usage
 legislation on commercial energy activities (trading, transport, storage, etc.)
 legislation affecting energy use, such as efficiency standards, emission standards
 instructions for state-owned energy sector assets and organizations
 active participation in, co-ordination of and incentives for mineral fuels exploration (see geological survey) and other energy-related research and development policy command
 fiscal policies related to energy products and services (taxes, exemptions, subsidies, etc.)
 energy security and international policy measures such as:
 international energy sector treaties and alliances,
 general international trade agreements,
 special relations with energy-rich countries, including military presence and/or domination.

Factors within an energy policy 
There are a number of elements that are naturally contained in a national energy policy, regardless of which of the above measures was used to arrive at the resultant policy. The chief elements intrinsic to an energy policy are:

 What is the extent of energy self-sufficiency for this nation
 Where future energy sources will derive
 How future energy will be consumed (e.g. among sectors)
 What fraction of the population will be acceptable to endure energy poverty
 What are the goals for future energy intensity, ratio of energy consumed to GDP
 What is the reliability standard for distribution reliability
 What environmental externalities are acceptable and are forecast
 What form of "portable energy" is forecast (e.g. sources of fuel for motor vehicles)
 How will energy efficient hardware (e.g. hybrid vehicles, household appliances) be encouraged
 How can the national policy drive province, state and municipal functions
 What specific mechanisms (e.g. taxes, incentives, manufacturing standards) are in place to implement the total policy
Do you want to develop and promote a plan for how to get the world to zero CO2 emissions?
 What future consequences there will be for national security and foreign policy

Relationship to other government policies 

Energy policy sometimes dominates and sometimes is dominated by other government policies. For example energy policy may dominate, supplying free coal to poor families and schools thus supporting social policy, but thus causing air pollution and so impeding heath policy and environmental policy. On the other hand energy policy may be dominated by defense policy, for example some counties started building expensive nuclear power plants to supply material for bombs. Or defense policy may be dominated for a while, eventually resulting in stranded assets, such as Nord Stream 2.

Energy policy is closely related to climate change policy because totalled worldwide the energy sector emits more greenhouse gas than other sectors.

Energy policy decisions are sometimes not taken democratically.

Corporate energy policy   
In 2019, some companies “have committed to set climate targets across their operations and value chains aligned with limiting global temperature rise to 1.5°C above pre-industrial levels and reaching net-zero emissions by no later than 2050”. Corporate power purchase agreements can kickstart renewable energy projects, but the energy policies of some countries do not allow or discourage them.

By type of energy 

Energy sources are measured in different physical units: liquid fuels often in volume or weight, natural gas by volume of gas such as cubic metres, solid fuel such as coal by weight such as tonne. To compare energy from different sources, energy based units are more convenient to use, such as joule, kilowatt-hours, British thermal units or tonne of oil equivalent.

Nuclear energy

Renewable energy

By country 
Energy policies vary by country, see tables below.

Examples

China

India

Ecuador

European Union 

The European Investment Bank took part in energy financing in Europe in 2022, a part of their REPowerEU package being to assist up to €115 billion in energy investment through 2027, in addition to regular lending operation in the sector.

Russia

United Kingdom

United States

See also

Energy balance
 Energy industry
Energy law
Energy security
Environmental policy
Oil Shockwave
Renewable energy policy
Sustainable energy
World Forum on Energy Regulation (WFER)

References

External links

"Energy Policies of (Country x)" series, International Energy Agency
Report of President Bush's National Energy Policy Group, May 2001
UN-Energy - Global energy policy co-ordination
 Energy & Environmental Security Initiative (EESI)
Renewable Energy Policy Network (REN21)
Information on energy institutions, policies and local energy companies by country, Enerdata Publications

 
Energy economics
Environmental social science
Power control
Climate change policy
Policy
Public policy